Acomb F.C. was an English football club from Acomb, North Yorkshire.

History
The club was formed in the 1880s, and was a founder member of the York Football League in 1897 and the Yorkshire League in 1920. 

They left the Yorkshire League after just three years but remained active and produced many players of repute, including George Lee, who signed for York City in 1936 and went on to win the FA Cup with West Bromwich Albion in 1954.

References

Defunct football clubs in England
York Football League
Yorkshire Football League
1880s establishments in England
Association football clubs established in the 19th century
Defunct football clubs in North Yorkshire